Aeginium or Aiginion was a town of the Tymphaei in ancient Thessaly. It is described by Livy as a place of great strength and nearly impregnable. 

It is frequently mentioned in the Roman wars in Greece. It was given up to plunder by L. Aemilius Paulus in 167 BCE for having refused to open its gates after the Battle of Pydna. It was here that, during the civil war between Pompey and Julius Caesar, that the latter in his march from Apollonia effected a junction with Gnaeus Domitius Calvinus. Later, the town was called by the name Stagos which was translated to Kalabaka.

Its modern location is tentatively assigned to a site in Nea Koutsoufliani in the municipality of Kalabaka. William Martin Leake found an inscription at Kalabaka, in which Aeginium is mentioned.

References

Populated places in ancient Thessaly
Former populated places in Greece
Histiaeotis